Feathering or feather is the long hair on the lower legs of some breeds of horse and pony. On some horses, especially draft breeds, the hair can almost cover the hooves. While nearly all horses will grow longer hair on the lower legs and back of the fetlocks at times, particularly in the winter, "feather" refers to the particularly long growth that is characteristic of certain breeds.

Feathering is a characteristic trait of the many of the Mountain and moorland pony breeds of the United Kingdom as well as draught breeds such as the Clydesdale, Shire, Friesian, Ardennes horse and Gypsy Vanner. The trait may appear in crossbreds of these breeds, though to date there has been little scientific study of the trait.

References

Horse anatomy

de:Langhaar#Pferde